Isaac Wardell is a record producer and composer who primarily writes sacred music. He is the director of The Porter's Gate Worship Project and the Director for Worship Arts at Restoration Anglican Church Arlington, Virginia.

Biography
Wardell is a graduate of KU Leuven in Belgium and Covenant College.

Discography

Production credits
 Producer - Caroline Cobb, A Seed, A Sunrise: Advent to Christmas Songs (2020)
 Producer - The Porter's Gate, Lament Songs (2020)
 Producer - The Porter's Gate, Justice Songs (2020)
 Producer - Liturgical Folk, Vol. 6: Psalm Settings (2020)
 Producer - The Porter's Gate, Neighbor Songs (2019)
 Producer - Liturgical Folk, Vol. 5: Advent (2019)
 Producer - Josh Garrels, Chrysaline (2019)
 Producer - John Lyzenga, In Troubled Times (2019)
 Producer - Matt & Micah, Let Love Be The Anchor (2019)
 Producer - Liturgical Folk, Vol. 4: Lent Hymns (2019)
 Producer - Matt Papa, Songs from the Wilderness (2019)
 Producer - Liturgical Folk, Vol. 3: Crumbs (2018)
 Producer - Wendell Kimbrough, Come To Me (2018)
 Producer - Paul Zach, God Is The Friend Of Silence (2018)
 Producer - The Porter's Gate, Work Songs (2017)
 Producer - Liturgical Folk, Vol. 2: Edenland (2017)
 Producer - Liturgical Folk, Vol. 1: Table Settings (2017)
 Co-Producer - Josh Garrels, The Light Came Down (2016)
 Producer - Wendell Kimbrough, Psalms We Sing Together (2016)
 Producer - Bifrost Arts, Lamentations (2016)
 Additional production, string arrangements - Sandra McCracken, Psalms (2015)
 Producer - Joseph Holm, God of the Sea and Sea Monster (2015)
 Producer - Bifrost Arts, He Will Not Cry Out (2013)
 Producer - Bifrost Arts, Salvation Is Created (2009)

See also
 Bifrost Arts
 The Welcome Wagon
 Sufjan Stevens
 Sandra McCracken
 Josh Garrels
 Audrey Assad

Notes and references

External links
official website

1979 births
Living people
American Presbyterians
Covenant College alumni
Composers from San Francisco